Filatima kerzhneri is a moth of the family Gelechiidae. It is found in Central Asia.

References

Moths described in 1989
Filatima